Roli Books is an Indian publishing house that produces books pertaining to Indian heritage. It was founded in 1978 by Pramod Kapoor and is jointly run along with his family. 

Its imprints include Lustre Press for illustrated books, India Ink for fiction, and the Lotus Collection for biographies, non-illustrated non-fiction books.

Origin
Roli Books was founded in 1978 by Pramod Kapoor, initially with an illustrated  book on Rajasthan, first printed in Singapore. The company developed relations with publishing houses in France following Kapoor trip to Paris in 1981, when he bought 3,000 copies of The Last Maharaja and sold the whole lot in India. Subsequently, they published books and sold them in France. By its 25th anniversary, it was also publishing fiction.

Imprints
Its imprints include Lustre Press for illustrated books, India Ink for fiction, and the Lotus Collection for biographies, non-illustrated non-fiction books.

Products
The company publishes coffee table books and limited edition books. Its publications include Calcutta Then, Kolkata Now (2019), and The Emperor's Table: The Art of Mughal Cuisine.

References

External links
Official website

Book publishing companies of India
Publishing companies established in 1978
Indian companies established in 1978